Maria Samson (born February 2, 1983) is a Canadian rugby union player.

International play
Samson represented  at the 2014 Women's Rugby World Cup. She made her debut at the 2011 Nations Cup against  with a 52-17 victory. In 2012, she was named as the Top Female Rugby Player in Canada. In 2013, Samson was the recipient of the Colette McAuley award.

Personal
In 2015, she was honoured as one of Avenue Magazine's Top 40 Under 40 for her work in sport advocacy and community leadership.

In 2016, she appeared on Season 3 of CBC's "Canada's Smartest Person". She won her episode (Episode 3) and finished 3rd in the Finale.

Samson attended McGill University, where she attained a Bachelor of Engineering degree in mining with a Minor in management. Samson also has her Masters of Business Administration from Queen's University, funded through the Canadian Olympic Committee via a Game Plan Scholarship.

References

External links
Rugby Canada Player Profile 

1983 births
Living people
Sportspeople from Montreal
Canadian female rugby union players
Canada women's international rugby union players
Female rugby union players